Fra McCann (born 19 June 1953) is an Irish politician. McCann became active in the Irish republican movement and was imprisoned in the 1970s for membership of the Provisional Irish Republican Army, and took part in the blanket protest while in prison.  In 1987, he was elected to Belfast City Council in a by-election, representing Sinn Féin.

McCann was elected to the Northern Ireland Assembly representing West Belfast in 2003 and again in 2007, 2012 and 2018.

He was imprisoned during the 1970s for firearms offences. While being held in H-Block 3 of the Maze, McCann befriended Kieran Nugent and participated in the blanket protest.

In June 2006 McCann was charged with assault and disorderly behaviour following an incident in west Belfast. The incident occurred as the PSNI were attempting to arrest a teenager for attempted robbery. However, McCann claimed heavy-handedness by the police and stated "I tried to put myself between one of the officers and the girl when the police officer radioed for assistance." McCann was released on bail.

In October 2021 Fra McCann announced that he would be stepping down as MLA for West Belfast and would not be contesting the next election.

References

External links
NIA profile

1953 births
Living people
Members of Belfast City Council
Northern Ireland MLAs 2003–2007
Northern Ireland MLAs 2007–2011
Northern Ireland MLAs 2011–2016
Northern Ireland MLAs 2016–2017
Northern Ireland MLAs 2017–2022
Politicians from Belfast
Provisional Irish Republican Army members
Republicans imprisoned during the Northern Ireland conflict
Sinn Féin MLAs
Sinn Féin councillors in Northern Ireland